Carey Gillam is an American investigative journalist.

Life and career
Gillam was born in Overland Park, Kansas. She started her career as a general assignment reporter for two small newspapers in Kansas. Gillam spent several years working for the chain of business publications owned by American City Business Journals before joining the Thomson Corporation as a banking reporter covering southeast regional bank holding companies. She joined Reuters News Agency. in 1998 where she covered agriculture, commodities markets, and general news assignments. Gillam left Reuters in October 2015 and in January 2016, joined the nonprofit investigative research group U.S. Right to Know as director of research. Gillam's articles since leaving Reuters have appeared in The Guardian, Time, UnDark and other outlets.

References

External links

American investigative journalists
Journalists from Kansas
American women journalists
Year of birth missing (living people)